Claudiu Tămăduianu (born 2 October 1962) is a Romanian wrestler. He competed in the men's freestyle 74 kg at the 1988 Summer Olympics.

References

1962 births
Living people
Romanian male sport wrestlers
Olympic wrestlers of Romania
Wrestlers at the 1988 Summer Olympics
People from Roșiorii de Vede